Susanna Javicoli (August 7, 1954 – June 17, 2005) was an Italian actress and voice actress.

Biography
Javicoli began her career as an actress in the 1970s. Some of her earlier works include starring in TV films which were adapted by plays written by William Shakespeare. Her film debut was in La nottata starring Sara Sperati. As a diplomat of the Silvio D'Amico National Academy of Dramatic Arts, Javicoli often made collaborations with many theatre directors such as Mario Missiroli and Carlo Cecchi.

As a voice actress, Javicoli dubbed Michelle Pfeiffer, Bonnie Bedelia, Elizabeth Perkins, Miranda Richardson, Holly Hunter and Melanie Griffith in some of their films. Her most famous dubbing role was providing the Italian voice of Darling in the 1997 redub of Lady and the Tramp and in Lady and the Tramp II: Scamp's Adventure.

Death
On 17 June 2005, Javicoli passed away after suffering from terminal kidney cancer. She was less than two months away from reaching her 51st birthday.

Filmography

Cinema
La nottata (1974) - Angela
Private Vices, Public Pleasures (1976)
Suspiria (1977) - Sonia
Armaguedon (1977) - Gabriella
Pigs Have Wings (1977) - Carla
Ecce bombo (1978) - Silvia
The Days Are Numbered (1979)
Action (1980) - Doris / Ofelia
Canto d'amore (1982)
Monitors (1985) - Susanna
Blu cobalto (1985)
Non più di uno (1989)
Body Puzzle (1992) - Mrs. Consorti
When a Man Loves a Woman (2000) - Adriana
The Last Kiss (2001) - Luisa

Dubbing roles

Animation
Darling in Lady and the Tramp (1997 redub)
Darling in Lady and the Tramp II: Scamp's Adventure

Live action
Madame Marie de Tourvel in Dangerous Liaisons
Susie Diamond in The Fabulous Baker Boys
Holly Gennero-McClane in Die Hard
Susan Lawrence in Big
Ed McDunnough in Raising Arizona
Carolyn Stilton in Kansas City
Tess McGill in Working Girl
Diana Roth in A World Apart
Juana in Kika
Mrs. Utley in P.U.N.K.S.
Dorothy Silk in The Human Stain
Audrey in Little Shop of Horrors
Leslie in Marked for Death
Lina Bingham in It's My Party

References

External links

1954 births
2005 deaths
Actresses from Rome
Italian film actresses
Italian stage actresses
Italian television actresses
Italian voice actresses
Italian voice directors
20th-century Italian actresses
21st-century Italian actresses
Accademia Nazionale di Arte Drammatica Silvio D'Amico alumni
Deaths from cancer in Lazio
Deaths from kidney cancer